San Andrés Semetabaj is a municipality in the Sololá department of Guatemala.  According to Jorge Luis Arriola's Geonimias de Guatemala (English:Name origins of geographic locations in Guatemala), Semetabaj means "stone of glass-like appearance" and originates from the Spanish word "semet", which means : bottle or flask and, by extension, glass, and by the k'akch'iquel "abaj" which means "stone". Originally, it was called San Andrés Limetabaj.

History 

The oldest reference of San Andrés Semetabaj after the Spanish conquest of Guatemala is in the Franciscan convent report written by friar Francisco de Zuasa in 1689, who said that San Andrés Semetabaj was a small town under the jurisdiction of the convent in Panajachel, with population 315 (297 natives and 18 criollos).

In his Descripción Geográfico-Moral de la Diósesis de Goathemala (English:Moral-geographic description of the Guatemalan diocese), archbishop Pedro Cortés y Larraz, written in 1770 after his ecclesiastical visit to his new archidiocese, talks about the San Andrés Tzemetabah town, which, with a population of 320 people was an annex to the San Francisco Panajachel parish.

Annual fair 

The annual fair in honor to Saint Andrew Apostle takes places during the last five days of November, being the main day 30 November, the celebration of the Apostle.

Climate

San Andrés Semetabaj has temperate climate (Köppen: Csb).

Geographic location 
The municipal capital is 1945 m above sea level.

The municipal capital is reachable through a paved road and through the "Las Trampas" access road, which merges with the CA1 highway (Inter American Highway, km 117) and has a length of 22 km. Guatemala City is 143 km away from San Andrés Semetabaj to the East.

See also
 
 
 List of places in Guatemala

Notes and references

References

Bibliography

External links
 San Andrés Semetabaj

Municipalities of the Sololá Department